To Jennifer is a 2013 found footage horror film directed by James Cullen Bressack and starring Chuck Pappas as a young man that sets out to confront his unfaithful girlfriend Jennifer. It was released direct to DVD on October 15, 2013. The entire film was shot and edited on the iPhone 5.

The film was followed by three sequels, 2 Jennifer (2016), From Jennifer (2017) and For Jennifer (2018).

Synopsis
The film follows Joey (Chuck Pappas), as he travels to meet his long-distance girlfriend of two years, Jennifer (Jessica Cameron). He believes that she is cheating on him and decides to film his trip down to her home in an attempt to elicit guilt from Jennifer over her presumed unfaithfulness. Joey manages to persuade his cousin Steven (James Cullen Bressack) and their friend Martin (Jody Barton) to join him on the trip, which turns into a car trip after Joey has a mental breakdown on a plane and puts them on the No Fly List. As the trio travels closer to their destination, Steven begins to grow leery of Joey's increasingly fragile mental state. This is further compounded by Joey's mother also showing concern over Joey during their Skype sessions, especially as he had never mentioned Jennifer to her before. Martin then goes missing, making Steven even more concerned.

Joey manages to convince Steven to keep driving and they eventually reach Jennifer's home. They find that she is at home, but has another guy with her. Joey confronts her, telling Steven to remain in the car. Wanting to see the film to its completion, Steven leaves the car and discovers Martin's corpse in the trunk. He enters the home to find Joey covered in blood. Joey murders Steven and then going after Jennifer. It's revealed that Joey was never in a relationship with Jennifer and was instead stalking her to fulfill his obsession with her.

Cast
Chuck Pappas as Joey
Jessica Cameron as Jennifer
James Cullen Bressack as Steven
Jody Barton as Martin

Reception
Critical reception has been mixed. Much of the criticism was due to the length of To Jennifer, as many of the critics felt that the film would have had more impact as a shorter film. Praise for the film commonly centered upon Bressack filming To Jennifer entirely on an iPhone, and a reviewer for Bloody Disgusting remarked that this gave the movie an "authentic video diary feel". DVD Verdict gave a mixed review, stating that "To Jennifer doesn't break any new ground as a horror story, but it works pretty well on its extremely small scale."

References

External links
 

2013 films
Mobile phone films
2013 horror films
American horror films
Found footage films
2010s English-language films
Films directed by James Cullen Bressack
2010s American films
English-language horror films